Karl I of Anhalt-Zerbst (17 November 1534 in Dessau – 4 May 1561 in Zerbst), was a German prince of the House of Ascania and ruler of the principality of Anhalt-Zerbst.

He was the eldest son of John V, Prince of Anhalt-Zerbst, by his wife Margaret, daughter of Joachim I Nestor, Elector of Brandenburg.

Life
After the death of his father in 1551, Karl inherited Anhalt-Zerbst jointly with his younger brothers Joachim Ernest and Bernhard VII according to the family law of the House of Ascania, without any division of the territories of the principality.

In 1553 Karl and his brothers inherited Anhalt-Plötzkau after the death of their  uncle George III.

In Zerbst on 16 May 1557 Karl married Anna (5 February 1531 – 13 October 1592), daughter of Barnim XI, Duke of Pomerania. The union was childless.

Karl died seven months before his last surviving uncle, Joachim I, Prince of Anhalt-Dessau. It was his brothers and their successors who inherited the territories of Joachim's principality.

Princes of Anhalt-Plötzkau
Princes of Anhalt-Zerbst
1534 births
1561 deaths